François-Léon Benouville (Paris 30 March 1821 – 16 February 1859 Paris) was a French painter noted for his Neoclassical religious compositions and for painting Orientalist subjects.

Life and career

Léon Benouville first studied with his elder brother, Jean-Achille Benouville (1815–1891), in the studio of François-Edouard Picot before he transferred to École des Beaux-Arts in 1837.  Like his brother he received the Prix de Rome in 1845.  Both he and his brother travelled to Rome. In Rome, as a Prix de Rome pensionary at the Villa Medici. He remained there for a year, but his brother stayed on for two more years. His works produced in Rome are influenced by early Christianity and often show representations of antiquity.

Work and style

Benouville was best known for his portraits, mythological and religious compositions in the Neoclassical and Orientalist style. He worked in oils, ink and chalk.

Awards, prizes and honours
In 1845, Benouville, together with contemporary Alexandre Cabanel, was the recipient of the Prix des Beaux Arts for his painting, Jesus at the Pretorium.<ref>GLUECKAPRIL, G., [ART REVIEW] "After the Fad: A Salon Favorite Now Forgotten," [Review of Training an Artist: Alexandre Cabanel and the Academic Process in 19th-Century France  Dahesh Museum, New York Times, 3 April-13 June 1998], 3 April 1998, Online: https://www.nytimes.com/1998/04/03/arts/art-review-after-the-fad-a-salon-favorite-now-forgotten.html?mcubz=3]</ref>

Select list of paintings
 Portrait of Leconte de Floris 1840
 Melancholy c. 1843
 Esther 1844
 The Mockery of Christ 1845
 The Wrath of Achilles 1847
 Christian Martyrs enter the Amphitheatre,'' c.1855

Gallery

See also
List of Orientalist artists
Orientalism

References

External links 

 François-Léon Benouville on Artcyclopedia
Hudson River school visions: the landscapes of Sanford R. Gifford, an exhibition catalog from The Metropolitan Museum of Art (fully available online as PDF), which contains material on Benouville (see index)

Academic art
French male painters
Orientalism
Orientalist painters
19th-century French painters
1821 births
1859 deaths